"The Sacrament" is a song by the Finnish band HIM, released in 2003. It is the sixth track and third single from the album Love Metal. The music video was directed by Bam Margera. The song was used over the end credits of the 2007 Japanese anime, Highlander: The Search for Vengeance.

Track listing

Finnish/German standard version

Finnish/German digipak - EP release

UK version Vol. 1 Enhanced CD

UK version Vol. 2 Enhanced CD

UK version Vol. 3

References

2003 singles
HIM (Finnish band) songs
Rock ballads
2003 songs
Songs written by Ville Valo